Spellman is a surname. The name is common among English, German and Irish people. The Irish version of the name is derived from Ó Spealáin and is more commonly anglicised as Spillane. Notable people with the surname include:

A.B. Spellman (born 1935), American poet, music critic and arts administrator
Alonzo Spellman (born 1971), American professional football player
Alyssa Spellman, American beauty queen; Miss America contestant 2005
Benny Spellman (1931–2011), American R&B singer
Ceallach Spellman (born 1995), British actor, TV and radio host
Eugene P. Spellman (1930–1991), American attorney and federal judge 1979–91
Francis Spellman (1889–1967), American Roman Catholic cardinal; archbishop of New York 1939–67
 Frank Spellman (1922–2017), Olympic champion weightlifter
Gladys Spellman (1918–1988), American politician from Maryland; U.S. representative 1975–81
Jack Spellman (1899–1966), American professional football player
John Spellman (wrestler) (1899–1966), American Olympic wrestler
John Spellman (1926–2018), American politician from Washington; governor of Washington 1981–85
Leora Spellman (1890–1945), American vaudeville performer and stage and film actor
Malcolm Spellman, American screenwriter and producer
Michael Spellman (born 1978), American film, television, and stage actor
Michael Spellman (footballer) (born 2002), English association footballer

Fictional characters
From the Sabrina the Teenage Witch comic book series:
Hilda Spellman
Sabrina Spellman
Zelda Spellman

See also 
 Spelman College
 Spellman Lake
 Spellman McLaughlin Home
 Spellman Museum of Stamps & Postal History
 Cardinal Spellman High School (disambiguation)